Coniophanes imperialis, the black-striped snake, is a species of snake in the family Colubridae. The species is native to Texas in the United States, Mexico, Guatemala, Honduras, and Belize.

References

Coniophanes
Snakes of North America
Reptiles described in 1859
Reptiles of the United States
Reptiles of Mexico
Taxa named by Spencer Fullerton Baird
Taxa named by Charles Frédéric Girard